Mehdi Bashiri (born April 14, 1992, in Urmia) is an Iranian scientist, inventor, academic, and writer.

Early life 
Mehdi was born in Urmia,Iran in 1992. He came to Istanbul for education in 2014. He began his education in dentistry at Istanbul Aydin University. He was the founder of the Istanbul Aydın University Innovation Club and served as the president. He made his first invention the same year and patented it.

Taking education from different universities and institutions in the field of bioengineering has given first inventing and innovation gifted children and gifted education in Turkey in this process over a thousand children who participated in this training.

In 2015, he was awarded the "Best Researcher Award" by the International Congress on Economic Cooperation Development on Health Focused on Islamic Countries. Bashiri won a gold medal at the 45th International Invention Fair in Geneva, Switzerland. He also received the special prize given by Russia in the same competition. In the INPEX 2017 invention fair held in Pittsburgh, U.S., he was awarded two separate medals of honor. To date, he has won over a hundred medals and awards in fifty-seven countries in the most prestigious competitions in the United States and Europe, 2017, he received the Inventor of the Year Award from the World Innovation Organization. In 2020, he wrote the book One Step to Glory, in which he tells about his life.

Awards and achievements 

 IFIA, winner of the best invention gold medal of the year by the Inventors' Organization 
 Gold medal in healthcare from the Geneva Invention Contest in Switzerland 
 Two medals of honor at the US INPEX competition 
 Invention Cup and Gold and Silver Medal of the Year Zagreb Meet up Competition in Croatia 
 Honorary Gold Medal of the Indonesian Inventions Organization (INNOPA) 
 Two gold medals and one silver medal in healthcare from the South Korea Seoul Patent Competition  
 Special gold medal of the Invention Organization of Russia
 Honor Award of the Romanian Inventions Organization
 Silver medal at ISIFA dating competitions in Istanbul 
 Honorary gold medal at the Warsaw Polish Inventions Competition 
 Bronze medal of the South Korean Inventions Youth Olympiad  
 Silver medal of the Kuwait Grand Prize 
 Silver medal of the Silicon Valley US Patent Competition  
 China Inventors Organization Honorary Gold Medal  
 Best researcher award in the field of health in Islamic countries

Innovations and inventions 

 Smart toothbrush for the disabled 
 Adjustable radiology bed without weight restriction 
 Needlestick Prevention Box 
 Fully automatic toothbrush 
 Smart OPG

Book 
 In 2020, he wrote the book One Step to Glory in which he talks about his life.

References

External links
 
 
1992 births
Iranian dentists
21st-century Iranian inventors
People from Urmia
Istanbul Kültür University alumni
Living people